Tanishqa Bhosale (born 29 May 1999) is an Indian model and beauty pageant titleholder. She was crowned Miss India International 2018 and also won the subtitle 'Miss Timeless Beauty' at the pageant. Tanishqa represented India at the 58th edition of the Miss International pageant held in Tokyo, Japan. She was awarded Panasonic Beauty Ambassador for the year 2018 and Miss Visit Japan Tourism Ambassador at Miss International pageant.

Pageantry 
Tanishqa's career in pageantry began when she was selected as a finalist for the 'Times Fresh Face 2017'. In 2018, she competed at the Glamanand Supermodel India 2018 competition, where she was crowned as Miss International India 2018, at a finale held in New Delhi, on 17 September 2018. After winning the title of Miss International India, Tanishqa was a show stopper in Manipur Fashion Week to promote sericulture. As Glamanand Miss India, she represented India at the Miss International 2018 pageant in Tokyo, Japan.

References

External links

Living people
1999 births
Indian beauty pageant winners
People from Pune
Miss International 2018 delegates